KMNR is an American non-commercial, educational, FM radio station licensed to the Board of Curators of the University of Missouri. However, KMNR is fully funded and operated by students at Missouri University of Science and Technology (formerly known as the University of Missouri-Rolla).

KMNR strives to provide educational, entertaining, and informative radio programming as a public service to the students, faculty, and administration of Missouri S&T and for the people of Phelps County.

Programming
KMNR is a "free-format" station. This means the on-air DJ chooses all program content, with the exception of standard educational productions, which KMNR airs to serve the public interest.

Personnel
KMNR is staffed entirely by students. Programming is provided by ninety to one hundred volunteer DJs. Station administration is performed by a seven-member executive board that is elected once per year from the body of DJs.

History
The first inkling of a Missouri S&T student-run radio station was conceived in the early 1960s (when the school was known as Missouri School of Mines (MSM)).  Some MSM students, including Roger Beckman, fabricated a makeshift radio station in the dormitories which was unofficially called KMFA, these letters standing for the original four buildings in the Quadrangle residential complex: Kelly, McAnerney, Farrar, and Altman Hall (although it was also known by something else – Kool MF Association). The station was located in the northwest corner in the basement of Altman Hall and egg cartons were used on the walls and ceiling to improve acoustics. It could be heard anywhere on the dial. Around 1962, Beckman suggested a campus-owned, student-run radio station to Student Council officer Dale Marshall who brought up the suggestion to Dean Wilson one night at a meeting.  Wilson requested Marshall to submit a project report, which was immediately approved upon review.

The project was on hold for one year while students brainstormed and developed the future radio station as well as familiarized themselves with the scrutiny of the Federal Communications Commission (FCC).  Finally in 1964, what was once a student prototype in the dorms of MSM, became a bona fide campus-owned student-run radio station with call letters of KMSM.  It first started playing jazz, easy listening, and light and heavy classical music in order for listeners to have an alternative venue to the rock and country music played by other Rolla radio stations.  Dr. Wells Leitner became the first faculty adviser; Jerry Kettler was the first educational program director; Wayne Huckabee was the first music director; Mike DeVaney was the first business director; and Dale Marshall became the first station manager.  The executive board hired its DJs, paying them a "princely" wage of fifty cents an hour.  Today's KMNR DJs work only for the love of free format radio.

KMSM's call letters became KMNR in 1972. The "MNR" is a reference to Missouri S&T's mascot, Joe Miner. KMST, formerly named KUMR, is a separate public radio station.  KMNR's studio has had at least three locations. The first known location was in T-6, a temporary building between Harris Hall and the current Mechanical Engineering Extension. As T-6 was 'temporary' the university allowed the students who supported KMNR to personalize the interior not only with various rooms but also with elaborate murals painted on the walls, the most prominent being the iconic "KMNR Boeing 747" painted in the 1970s, later replaced with the KMNR Space Shuttle in 1983. KMNR was located in T-6 from the early 1970s to 1997.  The original layout of the radio station was almost doubled in area in 1984 by the renovation of the space to the east of the control room, resulting in a larger library, larger lobby, and a large production room/studio to the northeast of the control room.  The original lobby, and the famous nooks and crannies that existed in that awkward space were sealed-off.  In 1997 T-6 was demolished to make room for a parking lot and KMNR was moved to a leased building at the corner of 12th and Pine Streets that had formerly housed a bookstore and fitness center. The building's interior was gutted and reconstructed to modern studio standards and KMNR remained there until 2005. KMNR's current location is the first floor of Altman Hall at the corner of 10th and State Streets. The station is now in the same building where its forerunner KMFA began.

Photos

Historical photos

References

External links

rollingbozorevue.com is a KMNR alumni website for fans of the 1970s KMNR program Rolling Bozo Revue
KMNR Website

MNR
Freeform radio stations
Phelps County, Missouri
Rolla, Missouri
Missouri University of Science and Technology